Thomas Wayne Perkins (July 22, 1940, Batesville, Mississippi – August 15, 1971, Memphis, Tennessee) was an American singer. He is best remembered as a one-hit wonder for "Tragedy".

Career
Wayne was the brother of Johnny Cash's guitarist, Luther Perkins. He released several singles between 1958 and 1964, primarily on the labels Fernwood and Mercury, including "This Time", which would later become a hit for Troy Shondell. He scored a major U.S. hit with the song "Tragedy" (credited to Thomas Wayne with the DeLons), which peaked at #20 on the R&B Singles chart and #5 on the Billboard Hot 100 in 1959. It sold over one million copies, earning gold disc status.

The song proved to be his only hit, however. Later, Wayne worked as a sound engineer, before he died in a car accident, at the age of 31, in Memphis in 1971.

References

External links

1940 births
1971 deaths
People from Batesville, Mississippi
Singers from Mississippi
Phillips International Records artists
Road incident deaths in Tennessee
20th-century American singers
20th-century American male singers